Eudonia paraequalis is a moth in the family Crambidae. It was described by Jacques Nel in 2012. It is found in France.

References

Moths described in 2012
Eudonia